Alfred Gause (14 February 1896 – 30 September 1967) was a German general during World War II. 

Gause took part in World War I, and was awarded both the Iron Cross, both Second and First Class. In the interwar years he was among the 4,000 officers selected to remain in the Reichswehr, the restricted sized German army. He served primarily on the staff of the First Prussian Engineer battalion.

During the Second World War he was a highly valued staff officer. Gause was initially sent to Africa with a large staff by Oberkommando des Heeres (OKH), the German Army High Command, to act as a liaison officer with the Italian high command, Comando Supremo. Gause had specific instructions not to place himself under the command of Erwin Rommel, but did so when Rommel told him categorically that the command of all troops in Africa were vested in him. This was not correct, but Gause acceded to Rommel's authority, and served as his chief of staff.  He proved invaluable to the famous desert commander, who was well known to direct his forces from the front and who frequently would lose touch with his command staff during operations. Gause spent two and a half years serving Rommel in the Afrika Korps. Though initially sent by OKH to keep an eye on the independent commander, they soon developed an excellent working relationship. In December, 1941 Gause was awarded the Knight's Cross of the Iron Cross. In early May 1943 he was rotated into the officer reserve force, and thus was off the continent when the Axis forces in Africa surrendered.

 Gause rejoined Rommel in his postings in Italy and Northern France. In September 1944 he became Chief of Staff of the 6th Panzer Army, which he held through the end of November. In April he was assigned to Generalkommando II Armeekorps in Kurland (General staff of Army Corps, Kurland). Alfred Gause was captured by Soviet troops in the Courland Pocket in 1945 and was a prisoner of the Soviets until his release in 1955.

Awards and decorations

 Knight's Cross of the Iron Cross on 13 December 1941 as Generalmajor and Chef der Generalstab Panzer Gruppe "Afrika"

References

Citations

Bibliography

 
 

1896 births
1967 deaths
Military personnel from Königsberg
Lieutenant generals of the German Army (Wehrmacht)
German Army personnel of World War I
Prussian Army personnel
Recipients of the clasp to the Iron Cross, 1st class
Recipients of the Knight's Cross of the Iron Cross
Recipients of the Silver Medal of Military Valor
Military Order of Savoy
German prisoners of war in World War II held by the Soviet Union
Reichswehr personnel